The Ministry of Foreign Affairs (Wazarat-e-Kharja, abbreviated as MoFA) is a ministry of the Government of Pakistan tasked in managing Pakistan's diplomatic and consular relations as well as its foreign policy. The MOFA is also responsible for maintaining Pakistani government offices abroad with diplomatic and consular status.

Minister

The Minister of Foreign Affairs is Cabinet member who responsible maintaining Pakistan's foreign policy as well as its diplomatic missions abroad. Bilawal Bhutto Zardari is the current elected member of National Assembly and Minister of Foreign Affairs.

Divisions
 Afghanistan, Iran & Turkey & West Asia Division
 Africa Division
 Americas Division
 China & SCO Division
 CAR & ECO Division
 East Asia & Pacific Division
 Europe Division
 Middle East Division
 South Asia Division
 United Nations Division
 Counter Terrorism Division
 Audit & Consular Affairs
 Arms Control & Disarmament  
 Economic Coordination & Organization of Islamic Cooperation 
 Finance Division
 Legal & Treaties Wing
 Strategic Export Control
 Spokesperson Division
 Policy Planning & Research
 Press Information Office

Departments
Bureau of Foreign Intelligence
Department of Comprehensive Nuclear Testings Ban
Department of National Assessment & Security Auditing
Department of Nuclear Disarmament, Non-Proliferation & Nuclear Power
Foreign Service of Pakistan
Foreign Service Academy
Institute of Strategic Studies

See also

Government of Pakistan
Politics of Pakistan
List of diplomatic missions in Pakistan
Foreign relations of Pakistan
Pakistani diplomatic missions

External links 
 

Foreign relations of Pakistan
Foreign
1947 establishments in Pakistan
Ministries established in 1947